David Rodriguez may refer to:

Sportspeople
David Rodríguez (water polo) (born 1955), Cuban Olympic water polo player
David Rodriguez (boxer) (born 1977), American heavyweight boxer
David Rodríguez (footballer, born 1986), Spanish football forward
David Rodríguez (soccer, born 2002), American soccer attacking midfielder
David Rodríguez (footballer, born 2000), Spanish football right-back

Others
David Rodriguez (singer-songwriter) (1952–2015), American folk musician and poet
David M. Rodriguez (born 1954), American Army officer
David Rodríguez Rivera, Salvadoran priest

See also 
Rodríguez (surname)